Igor Marković (born 16 December 1981) is a retired Montenegrin handball player.

Marković was a member of Montenegro national handball team since it was established in 2007. Today, he is a player with most played official games for Montenegro (49) and a fourth top scorer in the national team history, with 125 goals.

Career
Marković started his career in the youth teams of Cepelin Cetinje and Lovćen Cetinje. During his professional career, he played for Montenegrin clubs Lovćen Cetinje and Budućnost Podgorica. As of autumn 2013, he played for the Kuwaitian side AlQurine at the Arab Champions League.

With the Montenegrin national team, Igor Marković played at the World Championship 2013 and the Euro 2014. He is the player with most official games for Montenegro and the fourth top scorer in the national team's history.

Awards and accomplishments

Club
RK Lovćen
 Montenegrin League: 2006–07, 2011–12, 2012–13, 2013-14
 Serbia and Montenegro Cup: 2002-03
 Winner of the Montenegrin Cup: 2008–09, 2010–11, 2011–12, 2012–13, 2013–14

RK Budućnost
 Montenegrin League: 2009–10

Individual
Best handball player in Montenegro: 2010, 2011, 2012, 2013

References

Montenegrin male handball players
Sportspeople from Cetinje
1981 births
Living people
Expatriate handball players
Montenegrin expatriate sportspeople in Hungary
Montenegrin expatriate sportspeople in Kuwait